Tom Parton (born 2 February 1998) is an English rugby union player who plays for London Irish in the Premiership Rugby.

In June 2022 he was called up by Eddie Jones to join a training camp with the senior England squad.

References

External links
London Irish Profile
ESPN Profile
Ultimate Rugby Profile

1998 births
Living people
English rugby union players
London Irish players
Rugby union players from Oxford
Rugby union fullbacks